The Balve Optimum is a tournament between horse riders (CSI/CDI) in Balve. It is placed at Balve Wocklum, the home of Dieter von Landsberg-Velen. The aligner are the Turniergemeinschaft Balve GmbH with its managing director Rosalie von Landsberg-Velen and the Reiterverein Balve with its chairman count Landsberg-Velen.

History
The first riders tournament was organized in the year 1947.

German championship 2008

The winner of the German championship 2008 is:
Horse jumping
Meredith Michaels-Beerbaum
Eva Bitter
Dressage
Isabell Werth
Matthias Alexander Rath

External links

Reiterverein Balve 

Balve
Show jumping events
Dressage events
Sport in North Rhine-Westphalia
Westphalia culture